The United Nations Special Committee on the Situation with Regard to the Implementation of the Declaration on the Granting of Independence to Colonial Countries and Peoples, or the Special Committee on Decolonization (C-24), is a committee of the United Nations General Assembly that was established in 1961 and is exclusively devoted to the issue of decolonization.

History 
When the United Nations was created, there were 750 million people living in territories that were non-self-governing. However, the Charter of the United Nations included, in Chapter XI, provisions calling for recognition of the rights of inhabitants of territories administered by its Member States. It called for these Member States to aid in the establishment of self-governance through the development of free political institutions, as well as to keep in mind the political aspirations of the peoples.

The Charter also created, in Chapter XII, the international trusteeship system. This system allowed for the administration and supervision of territories placed under the control of the United Nations by Member States wishing to grant independence to their colonial possessions. These "Trust" territories were administered by the United Nations Trusteeship Council, which was created by Chapter XIII of the Charter.

Hoping to speed up the process of decolonization, the General Assembly passed Resolution 1514 (XV), also known as the Declaration on the Granting of Independence to Colonial Countries and Peoples. The Declaration stated that all peoples have the right to self-determination, and that immediate steps should be taken to end colonialism unconditionally.

Members
On 27 November 1961 the General Assembly created the precursor to the Special Committee by Resolution 1654 (XVI), which established a Special Committee of 17 members to examine the application of the Declaration and to make recommendations on how to better implement it. The original members were:

 
 
 
 
 
 
 
 
 
 
 
 
 
 
 
 
 

On 7 December 1962, the General Assembly added seven seats to the committee, bringing the total number of members up to 24. The number increased again in 2004, 2008 and 2010. The number 24 continues to be used when describing the Committee even though it now has 29 members.

International Decades for the Eradication of Colonialism 
In 1990, the General Assembly proclaimed 1990–2000 as the International Decade for the Eradication of Colonialism by Resolution 43/47, with the ultimate goal being the full implementation of the Declaration on the Granting of Independence to Colonial Countries and Peoples. The General Assembly adopted the report of the Secretary-General dated 13 December 1991 as the Plan of Action for the Decade.

On 8 December 2000, the General Assembly proceeded to proclaim the Second International Decade for the Eradication of Colonialism, lasting from 2001 to 2010 via Resolution 55/146. The Resolution called upon Member States to redouble their efforts to implement the Plan of Action during the Second Decade.

On 10 December 2010, the General Assembly proclaimed 2010–2020 as the Third International Decade for the Eradication of Colonialism via Resolution 65/119. The Resolution called upon Member States to intensify their efforts to continue to implement the Plan of Action during the Third Decade.

Working methods 
The Committee holds its main session in New York in June, as well as an annual seminar in the Caribbean and Pacific in alternate years. In 2018, the seminar was held in St. George's, Grenada.

At each main session, the Committee reviews the list of territories to which the Declaration on the Granting of Independence to Colonial Countries and Peoples is applicable and makes recommendations on its implementation and on the dissemination of public information on decolonization to the local population. It also hears statements from Non-Self-Governing Territories (NSGTs), dispatches missions to these NSGTs and organizes seminars on the political, social and economic situation in the NSGTs.

The Committee reports to the General Assembly on its work through the Fourth Committee (Special Political and Decolonization).

Listed non-self-governing territories 

Currently, there are 17 territories on the United Nations list of non-self-governing territories:

These territories do not have representation equivalent to other regions of their parent states. , several have rejected a change of status through referendums, such as New Caledonia in 2018, 2020, and 2021, the Falkland Islands in 2013, and Gibraltar in 2002. Likewise, in 2013, the elected Assembly of French Polynesia opposed the territory's inclusion in the list. Others, such as Guam, have voted for a change in status but been refused by their parent state.

Membership

The following are the current members of the committee:

Controversy
Territories with independence movements are disputed for their qualification as colonial countries and their admission for decolonization. Various current and previous members on various occasion have disputed and blocked the admission and re-admission of their respective territories for decolonization.

 Indonesia has disputed and hindered the re-admission of West Papua, and the admission of Minahasa for decolonization.
 China has blocked the admission of Hong Kong, Inner Mongolia, Macao, Tibet, and Xinjiang as non-self governing territories. China considers Hong Kong and Macau as territories forcibly ceded to European powers, the territories are possessions rather than colonies, and that China enjoys sovereignty over these territories. China claims that these regions are currently self-governed and are generally not considered as colonial holdings. However, invasion of Tibet and Xinjiang led to their current status as territories of China, and there have been various accounts of forced sterilization and abortion in Tibet and Xinjiang, forced labor and internment in Xinjiang, and forced assimilation, political control, and stripping of political representation to people of all these regions. 
 Russia has disputed at least 26 territories as colonial countries from admissions for decolonization. Among these Russian territories are Chukotka, Khanty-Mansi, Nenets, Yamalo-Nenets, Adygea, Altai, Bashkortostan, Buryatia, Chechnya, Chuvashia, Crimea, Dagestan, Ingushetia, Kabardino-Balkaria, Kalmykia, Karachay-Cherkessia, Karelia, Khakassia, Komi, Mari El, Mordovia, North Ossetia-Alania, Sakha (Yakutia), Tatarstan, Tuva, and Udmurtia. Historically, forced ethnic migrations have been conducted to retain control over certain territories. Though these territories enjoyed varying degrees of self-governance through sovereignty pacts reached with the Russian Federation, these pacts have since expired, and regional autonomy has gradually eroded.
The United States retains Puerto Rico as an unincorporated territory, which the committee has deemed insufficient in providing them self-determination. However, its Commonwealth status compelled the committee to remove it from the United Nations list of non-self-governing territories in 1952. And despite the U.S. Virgin Islands being on the list of Non-Self Governing Territories, 81.60% of voters in 1993 voted to remain as a U.S. territory with only 13.44% wanting "integration with the U.S." and 4.96% preferring independence in a 1993 United States Virgin Islands status referendum that was albeit invalidated due to less than half of eligible voters turning out.
The United Kingdom has hindered the British Indian Ocean Territory from decolonization by detaching the Chagos Archipelago from Mauritius. The United Nations General Assembly passed Resolution 2066 on 16 December 1965, which stated its belief that this detachment of part of the colonial territory of Mauritius was against customary international law as recorded earlier in the Declaration on the Granting of Independence to Colonial Countries and Peoples of 14 December 1960. This stated that "Any attempt aimed at the partial or total disruption of the national unity and the territorial integrity of a country is incompatible with the purposes and principles of the Charter of the United Nations".

Various organizations including British delegates claimed that the committee is 'no longer relevant' to United Kingdom Overseas Territories as many of its members are colonizers themselves, controlling various territories wanting independence.

Bureau 
The following make up the bureau of the Special Committee for the 73rd Session of the General Assembly:

Recommendation on Puerto Rico 
The Special Committee on Decolonization refers to the Commonwealth of Puerto Rico (an unincorporated territory of the United States) as a nation in its reports, because, internationally, the people of Puerto Rico are often considered to be a Caribbean nation with their own national identity. Most recently, in a June 2016 report, the Special Committee called for the United States to expedite the process to allow self-determination in Puerto Rico. More specifically, the group called on the United States to expedite a process that would allow the people of Puerto Rico to exercise fully their right to self-determination and independence. ... [and] allow the Puerto Rican people to take decisions in a sovereign manner and to address their urgent economic and social needs, including unemployment, marginalization, insolvency and poverty". However, the Special Committee removed Puerto Rico from the list of non-self governing territories in 1952 due to it gaining Commonwealth status in the United States.

In one of the referendums on the political status of Puerto Rico held in 2012, only 5.49% of Puerto Ricans voted for independence, while 61.16% voted for statehood and 33.34% preferred free association. Another then-recent referendum was held in 2017 with over 97% voting in favor of statehood over independence, though historically low voter turn-out (23%) has called into question the validity of the poll. Much of the low turn-out has been attributed to a boycott led by the pro-status-quo PPD party and the pro-independence PIP party. A 2020 referendum also backed statehood 53 percent to 47 percent, with 55 percent turnout.

See also 
 Dependent territory
 Proposed political status for Puerto Rico
 Sovereigntism (Puerto Rico)
 Special Political and Decolonization Committee
 United Nations list of non-self-governing territories

Notes

References

External links 
 United Nations official website
 Decolonization Committee homepage United Nations

Organizations established in 1961
United Nations General Assembly subsidiary organs
Decolonization